Alexi is a given name that is a variant or nickname of Alexander or Alexandra. Notable people with the name include:

Men 
Alexi Laiho (1979–2020), full name Markku Uula Aleksi Laiho, Finnish singer, composer, and guitarist of the death metal band Children of Bodom
Alexi Lalas (born 1970), American soccer player
Alexi Murdoch, British singer-songwriter
Alexi Giannoulias (born 1976), full name Alexander Giannoulias, American politician
Alexi Casilla (born 1984), full name Alexi Casilla Lora, American baseball player
Alexi Grewal (born 1960), Indian-American road racing cyclist
Alexi Ogando (born 1983), American baseball player
Alexi Zentner, Canadian-American author
Alexi Kaye Campbell, Greek-American playwright and actor
Alexi Ivanov (1922–1997), Bulgarian politician, birth name Alexe Bădărău

Women 
Alexi Spann (born 1986), American swimmer

See also 

 Alexey (includes Aleksei, Aleksey, Alexei)
 Aleksi
 Alexis (disambiguation)